KDA or similar may refer to:

 KDA (DJ), an English house DJ
 K/DA, a virtual K-pop group
 , the German name of the Combat Groups of the Working Class, a paramilitary organization in East Germany
 Kachin Defense Army
 Karachi Development Authority, a defunct urban development organization in Karachi, Pakistan
 Kollam Development Authority, an autonomous statutory body responsible for the development of Kollam city, India
 Kentucky Distillers' Association, a trade group of distillers that sponsors the Kentucky Bourbon Trail
 Kennedy's Disease Association, an American medical charity 
 Khulna Development Authority, an autonomous statutory body responsible for the development of Khulna city, Bangladesh
 Kilodalton (kDa), 1000 unified atomic mass units
 Kongsberg Defence & Aerospace, a Norwegian supplier of defence and space related systems and products
 Kotelawala Defence Academy, an alternative form of the name of General Sir John Kotelawala Defence University, a Sri Lankan joint services academy
 The ISO 639-3 code for the Worimi language, an Australian Aboriginal language